Bossa Nova is a 2004 Brazilian jazz album by jazz guitarist John Pizzarelli, who is typically known for his swing guitar skills. While not Brazilian, he has always enjoyed the music and therefore wanted to record this album. Some of the selections are penned by Tom Jobim, such as the classic tune "The Girl From Ipanema".

Critical reception 
AllMusic reviewer Ken Dryden praised the album for "Pizzarelli's soft, swinging vocals and strong but understated guitar," noting "Gershwin's 'Fascinatin' Rhythm' is easily adapted into a bossa nova."

Track listing 

"One Note Samba" (Jobim) – 4:42
"Fascinatin' Rhythm" (Gershwin, Gershwin) – 3:53
"The Girl From Ipanema" (DeMoraes, Gimbel, Jobim) – 4:55
"Your Smiling Face" (Taylor) – 2:57
"Estate" (Brighetti, Martino) – 4:58
"Desafinado" (Jobim, Lees, Mendonca) – 2:35
"Aquelas Coisas Todas" (All Those Things) (Horta) – 5:28
"I Remember" (Sondheim) – 3:45
"Francesca" (Pizzarelli) – 4:32
"Love Dance" (Lins, Williams) – 3:39
"Só Danço Samba" (DeMoraes, Jobim) – 3:29
"Aguas De Marco" (Waters Of March)" (Jobim) – 3:59
"Soares Samba" (Pizzarelli) – 4:56

Personnel
John Pizzarellivocals, guitar
Ray Kennedypiano
Martin Pizzarellidouble-bass
Harry Allentenor saxophone
Paulinho Bragadrums
Jim Saporitopercussion
 Pamela Sklar  flute

References

2004 albums
John Pizzarelli albums
Bossa nova albums